Human Crossing, originally titled , is a Japanese manga written by Masao Yajima and illustrated by Kenshi Hirokane. The manga is about a series of unrelated stories of people's life and their lessons in life. Human Crossing received the 1985 Shogakukan Manga Award for the General category.

Manga
 
Shogakukan published Human Crossing in 27 tankōbon between October 1, 1981 and March 1, 1991. The series was republished into 19 bunkoban between November 17, 1994 and June 15, 1996.

Anime
The series was adapted into a 13-episode anime in 2003 by A.C.G.T and produced by OB Planning. Directed by Issei Kume, it was broadcast on TV Tokyo between April 5, 2003 and June 28, 2003. It was licensed by Geneon in 2004. Each episode is a separate story of little relevance to each other. The anime is released in France by Kaze, and in Taiwan by Muse Communication.

The anime uses two pieces of theme song. "REVENGE ~Asu e no Chigai~" by Nana Katase is the opening theme, while "Believing" by Aki Asahina is the ending theme.

Geneon released a set of four DVDs for Human Crossing. They released the first DVD, Human Crossing - The 25th Hour on February 8, 2005, the second DVD, Human Crossing, Vol. 2: The Cicadas of Winter on April 26, 2005, the third DVD, Human Crossing, Vol. 3: Message in White on June 28, 2005, and the fourth and final DVD, Human Crossing, Vol. 4: Instructor's Rain on August 30, 2005. On March 13, 2007, Geneon released Human Crossing: Complete Brick Pack, which contains all four DVDs of the anime.

Maiden Japan has now licensed the anime series.

Episode listing

Albums
Avex trax released a soundtrack CD on Human Crossing anime's ending theme called, Human Scramble - Believing, on June 4, 2003. The CD uses Bobby Caldwell, Marsga Randcliffe and Debra Shane lyrics. It was sung by Aki Asahina. On July 16, 2003, Hiboom released a soundtrack CD for Human Scramble, containing the opening and ending themes of the anime. On January 7, 2005, Universal Music released a CD for Human Scramble, which was sung by Shinji Tanimura. On March 11, 2009, Universal Music created a SHM-CD version of Shinji Tanimura's 10-part album, which includes "Ningen Kosaten - Human Scramble".

Reception
Anime News Network's Theron Martin criticizes “The 25th Hour” episode, "which comes off as preachy, improbable, and forced" but he also commends the “Direction" episode for its "poignancy and emotional appeal" at the end. Anime News Network's Carlo Santos criticizes the second DVD of Human Crossing because of its animation, labeling it "stiff" and "choppy". Mania.com's Jennifer Rocks comments on the "stand-alone" nature of each episode more saying that it might be more rewarding if the anime is "viewed as a cultural study, rather than as pure entertainment". DVD Talk's Don Houston commends the anime on its "background detail" and writes that many of the episodes have a "universal appeal".

References

External links
 Official Kaze Human Scramble website 
 

2003 anime television series debuts
Geneon USA
Maiden Japan
Seinen manga
Shogakukan manga
TV Tokyo original programming
Winners of the Shogakukan Manga Award for general manga